John Nepomuk Tschupick (7  or 12 April 1729 – 20 July 1784) was a celebrated Austrian preacher.

Life 
Nepomuk was born in Vienna. He entered the Jesuit novitiate on 14 October 1744, and, shortly after, was appointed professor of grammar and rhetoric. In 1763 he became preacher at the cathedral of Vienna, a position which he filled during the remaining twenty-two years of his life with exceptional conscientiousness, prudence, and ability. His preaching was very successful and highly appreciated by Francis I (d. 1765), Maria Theresa (d. 1780), Joseph II (d. 1790), and the imperial Court.

Works 
Tschupick's sermons were remarkable for clearness and logical thought, strength and precision of expression, copiousness and skillful application of Patristic and Biblical texts. The first edition of his collected sermons was published in ten small volumes with an index volume (Vienna, 1785-7). This edition was supplemented by "Neue, bisher ungedruckte, Kanzelreden auf alle Sonn-und Festtage, wie auch für die heilige Fastenzeit" (Vienna, 1798–1803). A new edition of all his sermons was prepared by Johann Hertkens (5 vols., Paderborn, 1898–1903). An Italian translation was made by Giuseppe Teglio (4 vols., 4th ed., Milan, 1856).

References 

Attribution
 The entry cites:
 Sommervogel, Bibl. de la Compagnie de Jésus, VIII (Brussels, 1898), 261-3.

18th-century Austrian Jesuits
1729 births
1784 deaths
Clergy from Vienna